Han Kyu-chul (also Han Gyu-cheol, ; born December 24, 1981) is a South Korean former swimmer, who specialized in freestyle, butterfly, and individual medley events. He is a two-time Olympian (2000 and 2004), and an eight-time bronze medalist at the Asian Games (2002 and 2006).

Han made his first South Korean team, as an eighteen-year-old junior, at the 2000 Summer Olympics in Sydney. There, he failed to reach the semifinals in any of his individual events, finishing nineteenth in the 200 m butterfly (1:59.85), and thirty-third in the 200 m individual medley (2:06.42).

When South Korea hosted the 2002 Asian Games in Busan, Han won a total of four medals, including two in the freestyle relays. He also enjoyed his teammate Cho Sung-Mo by giving the Koreans a 2–3 finish in the 1500 m freestyle, earning him a bronze in 15:22.38.

At the 2004 Summer Olympics in Athens, Han shortened his program, swimming only in the men's 200 m freestyle. He cleared a FINA B-standard entry time of 1:50.54 from the World Championships in Barcelona, Spain. He challenged seven other swimmers in heat five, including three-time Olympian Jacob Carstensen of Denmark. Han rounded out the field to last place by two hundredths of a second (0.02) behind Hungary's Tamás Szűcs, outside his entry time of 1:52.28. Han failed to advance into the semifinals, as he placed thirty-third overall in the preliminaries.

At the 2006 Asian Games in Doha, Han added four more bronze medals to his collection for a total of eight. He also helped out his South Korean team, including three-time champion Park Tae-Hwan, to defend their medals from Busan in the 400 and 800 m freestyle relays.

References

1981 births
Living people
South Korean male medley swimmers
Olympic swimmers of South Korea
Swimmers at the 2000 Summer Olympics
Swimmers at the 2004 Summer Olympics
Swimmers at the 1998 Asian Games
Swimmers at the 2002 Asian Games
Swimmers at the 2006 Asian Games
Asian Games medalists in swimming
South Korean male freestyle swimmers
South Korean male butterfly swimmers
Asian Games bronze medalists for South Korea
Medalists at the 1998 Asian Games
Medalists at the 2002 Asian Games
Medalists at the 2006 Asian Games